Maskill is a surname. Notable people with the surname include:

Bill Maskill, American football player and coach
Colin Maskill (born 1964), English rugby league player and coach
George Maskill (1906–1969), English footballer
Raymond Maskill (1905–?), English rugby league player
Tommy Maskill (1903–1956), English footballer
Tony Maskill (born 1948), Australian photographer